Josh(ua) Cooper may refer to:

Politicians
Joshua Cooper (died 1757) (–1757), Irish landowner and politician, MP for County Sligo 1719–57
Joshua Cooper (1732–1800), Irish landowner and politician, MP for Castlebar 1761–68, for County Sligo 1768–83
Joshua Edward Cooper (–1837), Irish landowner and politician, MP for County Sligo 1790–1806
Josh Cooper, Canadian political candidate (Ontario), see Conservative Party of Canada candidates, 2004 Canadian federal election

Others
Josh Cooper (cryptographer) (1901–1981), British cryptographer
Josh Cooper (defensive end) (born 1980), American football defensive end
Josh Cooper (wide receiver) (born 1989), American football wide receiver